Songs from the Film is Tommy Keene's second full-length album and his major label debut. Originally released on LP and cassette in 1986 (Geffen Records, catalog #GHS 24090), it wasn't available on CD until 1998.

The album hit No. 148 on the Billboard 200.

Track listing
All songs written by Tommy Keene, except where noted
"Places That Are Gone" – 2:53
"In Our Lives" – 2:59
"Listen to Me" – 3:52
"Paper Words and Lies" – 2:23
"Gold Town" – 2:57
"Kill Your Sons" – 5:02 (Lou Reed)
Originally recorded by Lou Reed, 1974
"Call on Me" – 3:04
"As Life Goes By" – 2:23
"My Mother Looked Like Marilyn Monroe" – 3:19
"Underworld" – 5:00
"Astronomy" – 1:28
"The Story Ends" – 3:48
Bonus tracks on the 1998 CD version
"Take Back Your Letters" – 4:24
Previously unreleased; Songs from the Film outtake
"Run Now" – 4:42
Originally released on the Run Now EP (Geffen, 1986)
"Away from It All" – 2:54
From Run Now
"I Don't Feel Right at All" – 3:42
From Run Now
"Back Again" – 4:03
From Run Now
"They're in Their Own World" – 3:45
From Run Now
"We're Two" – 3:20
Previously unreleased; recorded in 1984
"Faith in Love" (full band version) – 3:15
Previously unreleased; recorded in 1984
"Teenage Head" – 3:44 (Roy Loney, Cyril Jordan)
Originally recorded by Flamin' Groovies, 1971
Previously unreleased; recorded live-in-the-studio
note: On the CD, "Take Back Your Letters" appears between "Underworld" and "Astronomy"; the remainder of the bonus tracks follow "The Story Ends").

Personnel

The band
Tommy Keene — Vocals, guitars, keyboards, percussion
Billy Connelly — Guitars, background vocals, lead guitar ("Teenage Head")
Ted Niceley — Bass guitar
Doug Tull — Drums

Production
Geoff Emerick — Producer, mixing ("Places That Are Gone", "Listen to Me", "Gold Town", "Call on Me", "As Life Goes By", "Underworld", "Astronomy", "The Story Ends")
Matt Butler — Engineer, mixing ("Places That Are Gone", "Listen to Me", "Gold Town", "Call on Me", "As Life Goes By", "Underworld", "Astronomy", "The Story Ends")
Frank Oglethorpe — Technical assistance, second engineer
Bill Wittman — Mixing ("In Our Lives", "Paper Words and Lies", "Kill Your Sons", "My Mother Looked Like Marilyn Monroe")
John Agnello — Mixing ("In Our Lives", "Paper Words and Lies", "Kill Your Sons", "My Mother Looked Like Marilyn Monroe")
Tom Zutaut — Production assistance
George Marino — Mastering
Jeff Magio — Executive producer (CD version)
Josh Grier — Executive producer (CD version)
Bob Clearmountain — Producer ("Run Now")
T-Bone Burnett — Producer ("Away from It All", "I Don't Feel Right at All", "Back Again", "They're in Their Own World", "We're Two", "Faith in Love")
Don Dixon — Producer ("Away from It All", "I Don't Feel Right at All", "Back Again", "They're in Their Own World", "We're Two", "Faith in Love")
David Donnelly — CD remastering

Additional credits
Recorded at  AIR Studios, Montserrat, West Indies
Recorded at Bearsville Studios, Woodstock, New York
Mixed at AIR Studios, Montserrat ("Places That Are Gone", "Listen to Me", "Gold Town", "Call on Me", "As Life Goes By", "Underworld", "Astronomy", "The Story Ends")
Mixed at The Record Plant, New York City ("In Our Lives", "Paper Words and Lies", "Kill Your Sons", "My Mother Looked Like Marilyn Monroe")
"Thank you Teresa Ensenat, Tom Zutaut, Bobby Keene, Ed Rosenblatt, Pat Day, Joe Picuri, Jim Crence, Josh Rowley, Yvonne Kelly and all at AIR Studios, Montserrat, Dody Bowers, Josh Grier, Don Dixon, Steve Carr, Big Joe"
Tom Zutaut — A&R
Teresa Ensenat — A&R
Mastered at Sterling Sound, New York City
Michael Hodgson — Art direction and design
Jeffrey Kent Ayeroff — Art direction and design
Just Loomis — Photography
Terry Robertson — CD design
Tommy Keene — Additional photography (CD)
"With thanks to the National Building Museum and Union Station Redevelopment Corporation, Washington, D.C."
CD thanks: "Tommy wishes to thank: Josh Grier, Jeff Magid, Bobby Keene and Ed Morgan", "Special thanks: Bill Bennett, David Berman, Brit Davis, Lyn Fey, Dave Garbarino, Kristin Hambsch, Julie Hall, Rich Hyland, Greg Lapidus, Clark Pardee, Mel Posner, Ed Rosenblatt, Robin Rothman, Jennifer Schiller, Annie B. Siegel, Robert Smith, Jim Walker, Jason Whittington"
CD liner notes — John M. Borack

Alternate versions
In 1998, Geffen released Songs from the Film on CD (catalog #GEFD-25225) with nine bonus tracks.

Sources
LP and CD liner notes

References

1986 albums
Tommy Keene albums
Geffen Records albums
Albums produced by Ted Niceley
Albums produced by Geoff Emerick
Albums recorded at AIR Studios
Albums produced by Don Dixon (musician)